Surfest is an annual surfing competition held in Newcastle, New South Wales, Australia. Surfest began in 1985 as an initiative of Newcastle City Council, and at the time, was the world's richest surfing competition. The event runs for thirteen days, and from the 2007 event, has been held at Merewether Beach, having been held between Newcastle Beach and South Newcastle Beach in the past.

Surfest adopted a festival-style approach in 2015, with smaller, more official events held on surrounding beaches in the lead-up to the main event.

Event champions

References

External links
 Association of Surfing Professionals
 Surfest
 Energy Australia

Surfing competitions
Surfing in Australia
Sport in Newcastle, New South Wales